Jacob Jackson Farm, also known as Maple Hill, is a historic home and farm and national historic district located near Hillsborough, Orange County, North Carolina.  The Maple Hill dwelling consists of a single pen, hewn log cabin (c. 1810) joined in 1940 by an ell to a two-story, weatherboarded log Federal farmhouse (c. 1820), and a 1 1/2-story, mid-19th century Greek Revival style wing. A frame dining room/kitchen block was added to the cabin in 1946. Also on the property are the contributing barn (c. 1855-1910) and agricultural landscape.

It was listed on the National Register of Historic Places in 1994.

References

Farms on the National Register of Historic Places in North Carolina
Historic districts on the National Register of Historic Places in North Carolina
Greek Revival houses in North Carolina
Federal architecture in North Carolina
Houses completed in 1820
Hillsborough, North Carolina
Buildings and structures in Orange County, North Carolina
National Register of Historic Places in Orange County, North Carolina